The March 2014 North American winter storm, also unofficially referred to as Winter Storm Titan, was an extremely powerful Winter storm that affected much of the United States and portions of Canada. It was one of the most severe winter storms of the 2013–14 North American winter storm season, storm affecting most of the Western Seaboard (especially California), and various parts of the Eastern United States, bringing damaging winds, flash floods, and blizzard and icy conditions.

Meteorological history
On February 23, 2014, an extratropical disturbance developed over the northeast Pacific. The system slowly began to intensify as it moved eastwards, before encountering an omega block that was situated over Alaska and the Northwest Pacific, on February 24, 2014. Over the next few days, the omega block broke down, and the system began to intensify more rapidly as it moved towards the southeast. On February 27, 2014, meteorologists identified the system as having of high risk of having major impacts in the United States. Winter Weather Watches and Winter Storm Warnings were initiated in many different parts of the Western United States. After a previous, weaker winter storm had moved through the West Coast on February 26, the winter storm turned towards California, resulting in Flash Flood warnings and high wind advisories being issued. Around that time, the winter storm was predicted to bring ice, snow, and blizzard conditions to the Central and Eastern States of the US. Afterwards, the system slowly began to weaken as it continued bearing down on the West Coast, although it continued to maintain its organization. The storm brought powerful winds and heavy torrents throughout much of the Western Seaboard, especially in California. Flash floods ensued throughout many parts of the state, resulting in some road closures. Early on March 1, the eye of the storm disappeared as the organization of the system began to deteriorate. Later on March 1, the winter storm continued to shrink in size as it weakened further, and the storm began moving ashore in Southern California. A secondary circulation developed near the southern end of the storm's circulation, which quickly dominated the system; the original surface low became completely detached from the system and was absorbed into another approaching storm on March 3. On March 1, the winter storm also spawned an EF0 tornado over Arizona, which was the confirmed first tornado in the Greater Phoenix since January 2005. Late on March 1, 2014, the winter storm's low-level circulation center made landfall over San Diego County. The winter storm triggered severe thunderstorms, and dropped hail while it passed through the Southwestern United States. The storm began to accelerate towards the east while building up convection. During the next couple of days, the winter storm's structure began to break down; however, the storm still brought blizzard conditions and ice to the Eastern United States. Early on March 4, the winter storm weakened and exited the east coast of the Carolinas, before being absorbed into the circulation of a much larger extratropical cyclone centered over the Labrador Sea later that day.

Impacts
On March 1, The storm caused at least 2 fatalities, at least 44 injuries, as well as several car accidents. On the same day, a plane was moved 3 feet and damaged by a microburst, near the John Wayne Airport at Santa Ana, California. While moving eastward across the United States, the storm caused more road accidents, and downed numerous trees and power lines. The storm also produced an EF0 tornado 9 miles south of Karnak, California, which lasted for 5 minutes. Another person was killed in Kansas, along with a student in Oklahoma. The winter storm later killed another 12 people and injured dozens more, before the storm weakened and left the East Coast on March 4, 2014.

Precipitation totals
North Carolina
Highest snowfall total reported was 2.5 inches at Norlina and Concord.

Virginia
Highest snowfall total reported was 9 inches at Manassas.

Maryland
Highest snowfall total reported was 8.3 inches near Clarksburg.

Delaware
Highest snowfall total reported was 5.3 inches at Milton.

New Jersey
Highest snowfall total reported was 8.3 inches at Bargaintown.

Pennsylvania
Highest snowfall total reported was 6 inches near Mount Pleasant.

West Virginia
Highest snowfall total reported was 10 inches at both Bruceton Mills and Burceton Mills.

Tennessee
Highest snowfall total reported was 5.5 inches at Halls.
6 inches of sleet was also reported at Clarksville, Huntington, and Big Rock.

Kentucky
Highest snowfall total reported was 7.6 inches near Prestonburg.

Ohio
Highest snowfall total reported was 5.2 inches in Shawnee Park.

Indiana
Highest snowfall total reported was  around 9.8 inches at Portage.

Illinois
Highest snowfall total reported was 5.5 inches near Hillsdale.

Missouri
Highest snowfall total reported was 7 inches of snow at Hunter.
5 inches of sleet was also reported in Dudley and Pemiscot County.

Arkansas
Highest snowfall total reported was 5 inches near Bella Vista and Pea Ridge.
4.5 inches of sleet was also reported at Biggers.

Texas
Highest snowfall total reported was 2 inches at Canadian and Lipscomb.
2 feet of sleet was also reported at Quitman and Van.

Oklahoma
Highest snowfall total reported was 5.5 inches near Miami.

New Mexico
Highest snowfall total reported was 20 inches in Taos.

Arizona
Maximum wind gust measured was 64 miles per hour, at Grand Canyon Airport.
Pea-sized hail was reported in Peoria.
On March 1, an EF0 tornado touched down in a park and moved over an apartment complex, damaging roof tiles, blowing in a car's windshield and two apartment windows, and lifting a hot tub up into the clouds. Several trees and a power pole were downed as well. This was the first confirmed tornado in the Greater Phoenix area since January 2005.

Nevada
Highest snowfall total reported was 3 inches at Incline Village and near Gardnerville.
Highest rainfall total reported was 0.95 inches at Gardnerville.
Maximum wind gust measured was 77 miles per hour near Mt. Charleston, at an elevation of 8,818 feet.

California
Highest snowfall total reported was 40 inches near the Kirkwood Ski Area.
Highest rainfall total reported was 14.54 inches at Matilija Canyon (Ventura County).
Maximum wind gust measured was 102 miles per hour, near Big Bear Resort (near Los Angeles) on Friday, February 28.
1-inch sized hail from a severe thunderstorm was reported at Walnut, early on the morning of Saturday, March 1.
At 6:34 P.M., PST, on Friday, February 28, an EF0 tornado was reported 9 miles south of Karnak, moving north at 25 miles per hour. The tornado lasted for 5 minutes before dissipating.

Tornadoes

A total of two tornadoes were reported from this storm system; one in California on February 28, and one in Arizona on March 1. The Arizona tornado caused $50,000 in damage.

See also 

 Tornadoes of 2014
 January 2008 North American storm complex
 October 2009 North American storm complex
 January 2010 North American winter storms
 March 2010 North American winter storm
 February 2013 nor'easter
 March 2013 nor'easter
 Early 2014 North American cold wave
 February 11–17, 2014 North American winter storm
 March 2014 nor'easter
 December 2014 North American storm complex
 January 2015 North American blizzard
 El Niño
 La Niña

References

External links 
 
 
 

Storm,2014,03
2014 in California
2014 in Nevada
2014 in Arizona
2014 in Utah
2014 in New Mexico
2014 in Oklahoma
2014 in Texas
2014 in Illinois
2014 in Missouri
2014 in Arkansas
2014 in Tennessee
2014 in Kentucky
2014 in Indiana
2014 in Ohio
2014 in Alabama
2014 in Georgia (U.S. state)
2014 in North Carolina
2014 in South Carolina
2014 in Maryland
2014 in Delaware
2014 in West Virginia
2014 in Virginia
2014 in Pennsylvania
2014 in New Jersey
2014,03